RFA Oakleaf (A111) was a Leaf-class fleet support tanker, formerly of the Royal Fleet Auxiliary, and the second ship to bear the name.

Formerly the Swedish vessel MV Oktania, built by A. B. Uddevalla, Sweden, and completed in 1981, Oakleaf was added to the Royal Fleet Auxiliary in 1986, before being decommissioned in 2007.

Role
As well as their role of replenishing warships at sea, support tankers perform the bulk movement of fuels between Ministry of Defense (Navy) depots. The Oakleaf had three Leaf-class sisters - Brambleleaf, Bayleaf and Orangeleaf. All four were originally designed as commercial tankers and underwent major conversions to bring them up to Royal Fleet Auxiliary standards and equip them for naval support. These involved adding a considerable amount of electronics, both in communications and navigational aids, fitting two replenishment rigs and increasing the amount of accommodation.

While the ships can provide some food and stores support, their main cargoes are diesel and aviation fuel. Oakleaf was capable of replenishing ships with fuel using a standard jackstay or derrick rig abeam and towed rig for astern replenishment. She was fitted to take containers on her main deck for the provision of stores and to enhance ship's stores capabilities for long deployments.

Design
The normal complement was 36, composed of officers and senior and junior ratings. Among the departments, the PO (Supply) was responsible for 5,000 stores line items as well as for food and drink, clothing and bedding. The RISC (Royal Fleet Auxiliary Interim Stores Computer) system was his only assistant on board.

Oakleaf was powered by a four-cylinder Burmeister and Wain long stroke oil engine capable of developing  driving a single controllable-pitch propeller. She also had bow and stern variable-pitch thrust propellers. Fitted with automatic power management, the vessel could be operated with her machinery spaces unmanned - as with her sister ships, her engines could be controlled from either the ship's bridge or the (air conditioned) machinery control room.

Service history
In September 1994, Oakleaf, participated in Operation Uphold Democracy in Haiti, replenishing ships of the international task force.

In July 1995, the West Indies Guardship,  and her support ship, Royal Fleet Auxiliary Oakleaf provided assistance following volcanic activity on the island of Montserrat.

She was decommissioned from the Royal Fleet Auxiliary in 2007, and laid up awaiting disposal at Her Majesty's Naval Base in Portsmouth. Oakleaf sailed from Portsmouth on 29 September 2010 in the tow of tug Mega One for Aliağa, Turkey for breaking, arriving on 22 October 2010.

References

External links

 MOD Oakleaf page

Tankers of the Royal Fleet Auxiliary
Leaf-class tankers
1981 ships